The Shivaganga falls is a 74 m high waterfall on the river Shalmala in Uttara Kannada, India. This is about 35 km away from the town of Sirsi. The waterfall is located in an area of thick forest.

References

Waterfalls of Karnataka
Tourist attractions in Uttara Kannada district
Geography of Uttara Kannada district